Sugar Rush is an American cooking television program that aired on the Food Network from 2005 to 2007. 

It was hosted by Warren Brown, a former lawyer who decided to become a pastry chef. Brown, who ran a pastry shop, Cake Love, and cafe, Love Cafe in Washington, DC, meets other pastry chefs and dessert makers and cooks with them. The show was described Brown "travel[ing] the country in search of interesting, outrageous desserts." Food Network staff said it was the first show featuring a Washington, DC-area food personality.

It had a 13-episode first season and was picked up for a second season. A total of two seasons aired on the Food Network with a total of 26 episodes.

The show originally aired at 9:30pm on Wednesdays  and included guests such as TV baker Duff Goldman and celebrity chef Jose Andres. 

It is currently available on Amazon Prime and Sflix.

References

External links 

Warren Brown profile
 

2000s American cooking television series
2005 American television series debuts
2007 American television series endings
Food Network original programming